The effects of pornography on individuals or their intimate relationships depend on the type of pornography used and differ from person to person. Consumption of pornographic material is associated with negative and positive impacts. It has been studied particularly for associations with addiction as well as effects on the brain over time. Some literature reviews suggest that pornographic images and films can be addictive, particularly when combined with masturbation, while others maintain that data remains inconclusive. Other research has looked at pornographic material's relation to acts of sexual violence, with varying results.

Methodology and key theories

Sexual scripting 

Pornography research is greatly influenced by script theory. Originally proposed by researcher Silvan Tomkins, script theory proposes that behavior is a series of "scripts," or programs in order to achieve a goal. These scripts provide meaning for specific behaviors in relation to a goal or desire. In 1986, Simon and Gagnon applied script theory to sexuality research, asserting that sexual scripts fall under a category of cultural scripts to regulate sexual behaviors. Modern research has applied this concept to work with pornography, and specifically how pornography may influence sexual scripts and behaviors. Some studies argue that pornography functions as a sexual script, cluing people in to certain signals and behaviors and influencing their own sexual behaviors in later encounters.

Pornography may alter individuals' expectations regarding sexual activity, which then impacts their ability to form and maintain romantic, or sexual, relationships. Pornography functions as a cultural script, a media through which individuals may pick up on or learn sexual cues. These cues lead individuals to express sexual behaviors and function in sexual situations at appropriate times. One concern is that, by relying on pornography for education on sexual cues or sexual scripts, individuals may have an altered sense of what sexuality and sexual intercourse truly entail, or how to behave sexually in a real-life scenario.

Typical gender roles can also confuse and alter expectations for the traditional heterosexual sexual script.  From an early age, boys are often taught to explore or embrace their sexuality more than girls. Pornography can often display women acting  with traditional male sexual scripts, thus creating a double-standard for the male of expecting a real life female partner to act in an unrealistic, exaggerated way that is portrayed in much pornography. Many young adult men can get confused or perplexed when having a sexual experience with a woman using a traditional female sexual script, as opposed to a more embraced, even sometimes aggressive sexuality, often outside the confines of a exclusive relationship, that is shown frequently in pornography that is constructed to cater to men.

Affection exchange theory 

Affection Exchange Theory classifies human affection and interaction as innate acts which assist individuals in mating, reproduction, and survival, as well as in developing and maintaining healthy relationships. This theory can be extended to sexuality to consider sexual acts as significant contributions to affection behavior. Humans express affection through a myriad of actions, including verbal affirmations and physical touch. This theory takes a more modern approach to traditional evolutionary theories, and extrapolates that affection communication plays a role in sexual selection and reproduction. Furthermore, Affection Exchange Theory posits that, although often found together, affectionate expression is separate from affectionate emotion. An individual may express unauthentic affection (expression without emotion), or may feel affection that they suppress (emotion without expression). Beyond relationship findings, more affectionate people also report better overall health, including more self-esteem, less anxiety, less fear of intimacy, and greater satisfaction with their lives and their relationships. Research on Affection Exchange Theory has been connected to pornography and couples research as a potential mitigator to relationship and sexual satisfaction, as well as sexual desire.

Methodology limitations
Pornography has many different forms which are difficult to cover in blanket form. Pornographic internet videos, for example, have been found to have different effects on viewers than material such as pornographic magazines. Within the field of pornography research, there are also other challenges that arise due to strong opinions and feelings on the topic. Confirmation bias has been prevalent on both sides due to societal taboos surrounding pornography. Studies have looked into both negative effects of pornography as well as potential benefits or positive effects of pornography. A large percentage of studies suffer from methodological issues. In one meta-study by researchers at Middlesex University in England, over 40,000 papers and articles were submitted to the team for review: 276 or 0.69% were suitable for consideration due to the low quality of research within the field.

One limitation to current research about pornography's effect on relationships is the sample. Researchers often, but not always, sample individuals who are in a relationship. They rarely sample both partners. This method limits the scope of research as pornography can affect a relationship depending on how often one or both partners watch and if they watch alone or together. For example, a Norwegian study on heterosexual partners evaluated these effects. The study found that couples experience higher levels of dysfunction when only one partner is watching alone. Partners who both watch pornography alone experienced low levels of dysfunction. Partners who did not watch at all experienced an average level of dysfunction.

Psychological effects 
Men who consume pornography regularly have reported less stable mental health, specifically higher levels of depression. Pornography can be considered addictive, especially in men.

Pornography addiction

Pornography addiction is a purported behavioral addiction characterized by compulsive, repeated use of pornographic material which causes serious consequences to one's physical, mental, social, and/or financial well-being. There is no diagnosis of pornography addiction in the current Diagnostic and Statistical Manual of Mental Disorders (DSM-5), though the DSM-5 considered the diagnosis of hypersexuality-related behavioral disorders (to which porn addiction was a subset), but rejected it because "there is insufficient peer-reviewed evidence to establish the diagnostic criteria and course descriptions needed to identify these behaviors as mental disorders." Instead, some psychologists suggest that any maladaptive sexual symptoms represent a manifestation of an underlying disorder, such as depression or anxiety which is simply manifesting itself sexually, or, alternatively, there is no underlying disorder and the behavior simply is not maladaptive. It is argued that psychologists do not recognize the concept of addiction, only chemical dependence, and some believe the concept and diagnosis to be stigmatizing and unhelpful. 

Two 2016 neurology reviews found evidence of addiction related brain changes in internet pornography users. Psychological effects of these brain changes are described as desensitization to reward, a dysfunctional anxiety response, and impulsiveness. Another 2016 review suggests that internet behaviors, including the use of pornography, be considered potentially addictive, and that problematic use of online pornography be considered an "internet-use disorder".

Introductory psychology textbook authors Coon, Mitterer and Martini, passingly mentioning NoFap (former pornography users who have since chosen to abstain from the material) speak of pornography as a "supernormal stimulus" but use the model of compulsion rather than addiction.

A number of studies have found neurological markers of addiction in Internet porn users, which is consistent with a large body of research finding similar markers in other kinds of problematic internet users. Yet other studies have found that critical biomarkers of addiction are missing.

According to the American Society of Addiction Medicine, some psychological and behavioral changes characteristic of addiction brain changes include addictive cravings, impulsiveness, weakened executive function, desensitization, and dysphoria. BOLD fMRI results have shown that individuals diagnosed with compulsive sexual behavior (CSB) show enhanced cue reactivity in brain regions associated traditionally with drug-cue reactivity. These regions include the amygdala and the ventral striatum. Men without CSB who had a long history of viewing pornography exhibited a less intense response to pornographic images in the left ventral putamen, possibly suggestive of desensitization. ASAMs position is inconsistent with the American Association of Sex Educators, Counselors, and Therapists, who cite lack of strong evidence for such classification, describing ASAM as not informed by "accurate human sexuality knowledge". 

Neuropsychopharmacological and psychological researches on pornography addiction conducted between 2015 and 2021 have concluded that most studies have been focused entirely or almost exclusively on men in anonymous settings, and the findings are contradicting. Some researches support the idea that pornography addiction qualifies as a form of behavioral addiction into the umbrella construct of hypersexual behavior and/or a subset of compulsive sexual behavior (CSB), and should be treated as such, whereas others have detected the increased activation of ventral striatal reactivity in men for cues predicting erotic but not monetary rewards and cues signaling erotic pictures, therefore suggesting similarities between pornography addiction and conventional addiction disorders.

ICD-11 added pornography to CSBD. CSBD is not an addiction and should not be conflated with sex addiction.

Some clinicians and support organizations recommend voluntary use of Internet content-control software, internet monitoring, or both, to manage problematic online pornography use. Sex researcher Alvin Cooper and colleagues suggested several reasons for using filters as a therapeutic measure, including curbing accessibility that facilitates problematic behavior and encouraging clients to develop coping and relapse prevention strategies. Cognitive therapist Mary Anne Layden suggested that filters may be useful in maintaining environmental control. Internet behavior researcher David Delmonico stated that, despite their limitations, filters may serve as a "frontline of protection."

DSM-5-TR, published in March 2022, does not recognize a diagnosis of porn addiction.

Rothman stated "The professional public health community is not behind the recent push to declare pornography a public health crisis." She and another researcher have called these moves a "political stunt".

Withdrawal symptoms 
Individuals who have developed form of dependence on pornography use, and do consider themselves as addicted to pornography, have experienced withdrawal symptoms. A study on effects and consumption of pornography across large sample of students from various universities has shown more than a half tried to give up consumption for pornography (or at least minimize the use of such material). Within those who at least made one attempt, almost 75% experienced at least one symptom of withdrawal. Withdrawal symptoms included erotic dreams, irritability, attention disturbance, and sense of loneliness. Other recorded potential symptoms included depression, anxiety, obsessive thoughts, and an intense longing for pornography. On topic on anxiety, a survey performed on a sample of internet users with porn dependency, concluded 24% of the participants had experienced anxiety symptoms if access to porn on the Internet was inhibited. Individuals who showcased an abstinence from online pornography has shown "most common positive effects" to include improvements in day-to-day functioning, increased energy, mental clarity and productivity. Some surveyed individuals even experienced enhanced sensation and greater pleasure from ordinary activities.

Body image and self esteem

Men
A study of 359 college men found that high viewership of pornography relates to increased masculinity and body dissatisfaction. Sexual performance changes a man's view of his masculinity, and often his self-esteem. Pornography is not the only factor affecting men's self-esteem and body image. Popular media often depicts strong but lean men. Pornography is significant to men's self-image. It connects a lean body type to sexual validation. As of 2021, few studies have evaluated how exposure to pornography relates to men's body image. Researchers recommend that others conduct more studies on pornography's effect on men's psychology.

Heterosexual pornography reinforces a concept called the centerfold syndrome. In 1995, psychologist Gary R. Brooks wrote about men and the centerfold syndrome. This concept asserted that gender roles in media contribute to high sexual dysfunction in men. Sexual dysfunction has many parts. One part is the viewing of women as body parts, trophies, or sexual conquests. These concepts are often known as voyeurism, objectification, and trophyism. Another part is tying female approval of manliness to a man's self-image. The third part of sexual dysfunction includes avoiding intimacy, attachment, and emotions. Heterosexual pornography reinforces this syndrome through observational learning. In other words, the story within pornography becomes the expected reality. Deviations from that story create low self-esteem.

Women
Studies rarely observe women's viewership of pornography. One modern study with female subjects provided mixed results. Pornography does not affect women's perception of body image and relationship satisfaction if it is free of behavior. Violence is one example. All other viewership appears to minimally affect body image and relationship satisfaction.

A 2021 study has shown a mediating role of pornography use among women and how it affects the consciousness of body image and attachment insecurities. Girls who have not experienced a sensitive response to their needs and/or were emotionally deprived under the parent/caretaker childhood environment had a greater chance of developing insecurities about their body image. The use of pornography seems to amplify attachment fears and anxiety. Such anxiety is correlated to females seeking approval of their bodies and self-worth from their counterpart in a relationship setting. The findings did correlate with past research articles which found that "anxious but not avoidant attachment affects body image, the drive for thinness, body dissatisfaction and body appreciation." Furthermore, pornography use could also amplify women's body image self-consciousness in an intimate setting. The acts performed in pornographic movies created a feeling of pressure among women, not only creating a higher negative body image but also the feeling of being criticized by their partners if their body was not resembling the body shape of models in pornographic content. However, mediating role between pornography, and anxiety attachment, and body image self-consciousness was found only in women in a relationship at the time of the study, which correlated with attachment theory.

Delay discounting 

A 2019 survey of 1083 U.S. adults evaluated the relationship between pornography and unethical behavior in the workplace. Unethical behavior, according to the researchers, consists of delay discounting and dehumanization. Delay discounting involves the idea of waiting versus acting now and future reward. It is to expect lower rewards in the future versus when acting now. The expectation of a high reward for acting now can lead to reduced self-control and increased impulsivity. Dehumanization is a form of moral disengagement in which people view others as less than human. According to the study, increased pornography use causes increased dehumanization and unethical behavior.

Sexual effects 
The sexual effects of pornography on intimacy and relationships observe some of the most gendered differences. Men and women differ vastly in how they are impacted by pornography both within and beyond a romantic or sexual relationship.

The consumption of pornography has been shown to have an impact on sexual risk-taking, including less frequent usage of condoms and birth control, as well as more casual sexual encounters. It can negatively impact sexual functioning, especially in men. However, pornography can function as an educational resource for individuals to improve their sexual knowledge, and women who consume pornography more regularly experience increased desire for sexual activity, indicating that pornography might be useful as a form of foreplay.

Sexual desire 

Sexual desire is one of the factors most strongly moderated by gender differences. In general, men experience the most acute effects from pornography in terms of sexual desire. Straight men report less sexual desire, both for their partner and in general, directly after consuming pornography. Men also typically utilize pornography for masturbation and solo-sexual activities, rather than partnered or joint purposes. Strong associations exist between increased pornography consumption, as well as frequency of pornography consumption, and problematic decreases in sexual desire for men. Men who more frequently use pornography report less desire for their partner, and less desire for sex in general.

While most modern research on pornography focuses on men, the findings in women hold interesting information on pornography's gendered impact on sexual desire. Women have found a positive correlation between pornography consumption and sexual desire, indicating that women who view pornography feel more positively about expressing their sexual desire. In addition to increased sexual desire, women also express more sexual desire specifically for their partner on days when they watch pornography, indicating pornography may function as a form of foreplay.

Although men and women do differ in many significant ways with respect to pornography consumption and sexual behavior, they share one important similarity: brain activity. Men and women's brain activity while watching pornography is nearly identical, suggesting that both men and women experience similar arousal while watching pornography. Further, both men and women report significant support for female-centric pornography, though men express similar levels of arousal to both traditional male-centric pornography as well as female-centric pornography. While women report more general negativity towards traditional, male-centric pornography, women express stronger support and higher levels of self-reported arousal for female-centric pornography.

In general, pornography consumption in couples has been associated with greater sexual desire. Although research in the way of same-sex relationships is limited, available findings indicate that pornography use is connected to an increased level of sexual desire. Men partnered with women report less sexual desire in general with increased pornography consumption, whereas women in both mixed-sex or same-sex relationships report greater sexual desire overall. Also, individuals were less likely to consume pornography the day after engaging in sexual intercourse.

In 2016, model and actress Pamela Anderson and Orthodox Rabbi Shmuley Boteach co-authored a viral Wall Street Journal opinion piece, in which they called online pornography a "public hazard of unprecedented seriousness."

Sexual function 
Sexual function is a rising concern with pornography consumption. Primarily thought to affect men, there is a notable relationship between pornography consumption and sexual function problems. Commonly reported problems include erectile dysfunction, delayed ejaculation, anorgasmia, and a lack of sexual desire. Recently, rates of sexual dysfunction have been increasing in younger age brackets. Medical professionals suspect pornography may be one factor contributing to this increase, however there is little causal evidence of such an effect. Another issue is delayed ejaculation, during which men may experience a large disconnect between their orgasm and ejaculation, or difficulty achieving ejaculation. Overarching research shows little evidence of pornography having any effect on delayed ejaculation. Despite the lack of evidence for more physical issues with sexual function, pornography is related to problematic decreases of sexual desire and sexual satisfaction, though the direction of this relationship remains up for debate without additional causal research.

In women, there is little evidence for pornography-induced sexual dysfunction. The most commonly observed effect is increased anxiety or distress, which may then lead to issues of sexual function. The most commonly reported issue for women is arousal dysfunction, indicating a difficulty in achieving or maintaining arousal during sexual activity. This could potentially lead to physical issues, such as painful penetration or vaginismus, making sexual intercourse painful and unpleasant. Women also tend to report more negative effects with regards to pornography, including strong feelings of shame or guilt.

For both men and women, pornography may lead individuals to make riskier decisions with their sexual health. A study analyzing the use of barrier contraceptives by German adults found that, when pornography is viewed as an educational resource, there is an inverse relationship between pornography consumption and condom usage; people who viewed more pornography tended to not use condoms as frequently. Overall, the most frequently reported issues with sexual function that relate to pornography are decreases in sexual desire for men, and decreases in sexual satisfaction overall.

Sexual satisfaction 
Research on pornography's effect on sexual satisfaction is highly varied. Numerous studies looking at both individuals and couples have found different, at times contradictory, results. One study found a negative relationship between pornography consumption and sexual satisfaction across two samples of men. In addition, frequency of pornography consumption, rather than the type of pornography consumed, is negatively correlated with sexual satisfaction; the type of pornography an individual consumed had no effect on sexual satisfaction. When considering couples and their pornography consumption, couples with a greater discordance reported being more sexually dissatisfied than couples who watched pornography together, as well as couples who jointly abstained from pornography altogether.

When looking at women, there is a positive correlation between pornography consumption and sexual satisfaction. Some suggest the connection between male pornography use and sexual dissatisfaction may be the other way around, with men resorting to pornography due to sexual satisfaction, or even perhaps a cyclical effect. An indirect, yet positive, effect on sexual satisfaction has been found when looking at sexual preference.

Individuals who use pornography alongside masturbation as the primary tool of sexual arousal and fulfillment of one's sexual satisfaction (or needs) may become conditioned to prefer pornography more than other needs of sexual arousal. Furthermore, the "frequency of pornography consumption was also directly related to a relative preference for pornographic rather than partnered sexual excitement." The individuals in the given study primarily used pornography for masturbation purposes. Such preference of pornography over sexual satisfaction fulfilled with a partner, especially in the case of extracting sexual information from pornography, would lead to lower overall sexual satisfaction. Individuals who seek pornography as the main source of information about sexuality were associated with lower sexual excitement, and in return, lower sexual satisfaction in a partnered relationship. Gender did not affect the results of such findings.

However, pornography among some individuals is not only used for sexual satisfaction. A study on affection substitution has shown that "pornography consumption is positively related to affection deprivation, depression, and loneliness and inversely related to experienced affection, relational satisfaction, and closeness." All presented above variants, except affection deprivation, had a significant correlation based on statistical data. Due to such positive relations, individuals who consume pornography not only use it to satisfy their sexual arousal but also to reduce loneliness and create a coping mechanism against social disconnection. Some of the examples of coping mechanisms may include "creating parasocial relationships with the characters depicted in pornography."

Sexual preferences 
The use of pornography is extremely varied, especially in the United States. Consumption rates —including general consumption, frequency of consumption, length of time, and type of pornography— vary by gender, age, and relationship status, as well as frequency of consumption, which all factor into overall pornography consumption rates. In general, men consume more pornography, and consume pornography more frequently, than women. A vast majority of men report having consumed pornography, with rates ranging from 50% to 90%, usually plateauing in the upper 80% range. Women, however, report significantly less and significantly more varied consumption of pornography, with between 30% and 80% of women saying they have viewed pornography in their lifetime. This variation reflects differences in nationality and culture in terms of sex positivity and pornography acceptance, as well as the unreliability of self-reporting. Despite the variation and lower reports of pornography consumption for women, female viewership of pornography is steadily increasing. Women tend to prefer less hardcore porn compared to men, and men report consuming pornography in conjunction with masturbation more frequently than women.

One of the more current findings revolves around how pornography impacts sexual preference. Theories speculate that increase pornography consumption may alter an individual's preferences during sexual intercourse to more closely resemble what is depicted in pornography. This may include both the acts depicted, as well as the behaviors displayed by actors. Among men, there is a positive relationship between pornography consumption and a desire for more porn-like sexual experience. Frequency of consumption and type of pornography consumed are related to increased desire for more porn-like sex, which is measured by items  indicating an expressed preference for "kinkier sex," "hotter sex," and a more porn-like "sexual appearance." The latter includes grooming habits, as well as hair color and body type. While correlational, the findings do present evidence that pornography consumption has a role in sexual preferences, though causal relationships cannot be confirmed. This effect is mitigated by both the type of pornography consumed, as well as the frequency of pornography consumption, and the finding holds for both men and women.

A study by Professor Kathryn C. Seigfried-Spellar and Professor Marcus Rogers found results which suggested deviant pornography use followed a Guttman-like progression, concluding that individuals with a younger "age of onset" for adult pornography use were more likely to engage in deviant pornography (bestiality or child) compared to those with a later "age of onset".

Prolonged exposure to pornographic content can lead to a development of increased sexual stimuli tolerance. Study showed earlier exposure may lead to potential desensitization to the stimuli, meaning individuals seek longer stimulation (12.0%) and more intensive sexual stimuli (17.6%) to reach climax. Such increase in tolerance was connected to a change in online pornography use pattern, major one's being "switching to a novel genre of explicit material (46.0%), use of materials that do not​ match sexual orientation (60.9%) and need to use more extreme (violent) material (32.0%)."

A cross-sectional study on prevalence and patterns in pornography use has detected individuals who mentioned an increased need for more extreme content. Although this may have been depicted as a result of desensitization due to frequent use of pornography, thus a need to use more graphic, violent, and degrading porn material to achieve similar sexual arousal, the actual causation comes from aggression as "more extreme pornography material was more frequently reported by males describing themselves as aggressive." On the other hand, females who increased their search for extreme pornographic content came from the curiosity aspect itself rather than a need due to desensitization.

The research focused on associations of dark personality traits with online activities has also found some dark traits related to online sexual use. Specific online activities of the study covered social media, online gaming, online gambling, online shopping and online sex. The results showed that "Machiavellianism, spitefulness, sadism, and narcissism were related to different types of internet activities such as online sex, social media use, online gambling, online gaming, and online shopping." Individuals' correlation to sexual use to such study variables is Machiavellianism (.32), spitefulness (.31), sadism (.34), narcissism (.24), and psychopathy (.26).

Sexual violence

Controlled studies

A controlled study describes the relationship between given behaviors or environmental conditions and health effects in a laboratory setting in which conditions other than those under study are effectively held constant across groups of participants receiving various levels of the experimental condition(s).  Since it is considered that the only functional difference between groups is the level of experimental condition(s) received, researchers can strongly infer cause-and-effect relationships from statistically significant associations between experimental condition(s) and health consequences. Thus, if executed properly, controlled studies have high levels of internal validity. However, such studies often suffer from questionable external validity due to the considerable differences between real-world environments and the experimental context, and the consequent belief that results cannot be generalized beyond that context.

The link between pornography and sexual aggression has been the subject of multiple meta-analyses. Meta-analyses conducted in the 1990s suggested to researchers that there might not be an association of any kind between pornography and rape supportive attitudes in non-experimental studies. However, a meta-analysis by Hald, Malamuth and Yuen (2000) suggests that there is a link between consumption of violent pornography and rape-supportive attitudes in certain populations of men, particularly when moderating variables are taken into consideration.

A meta-analysis conducted in 2015 found that pornography "consumption was associated with sexual aggression in the United States and internationally, among males and females, and in cross-sectional and longitudinal studies. Associations were stronger for verbal than physical sexual aggression, although both were significant. The general pattern of results suggested that violent content may be an exacerbating factor."

An earlier review of this literature by Ferguson and Hartley in 2009 argued that "it is time to discard the hypothesis that pornography contributes to increased sexual assault behavior". They stated that the authors of some studies tended to highlight positive findings while de-emphasizing null findings and concluded that controlled studies, on balance, were not able to support links between pornography and sexual violence.

Ferguson and Hartley updated their review with a 2020 meta-analysis. This meta-analysis concluded that mainstream pornography could not be linked to sexual violence and was associated with reductions in sexual violence at the societal level. Small correlations were found between violent porn viewing and sexual aggression, but evidence was unable to differentiate whether this was a causal or selection effect (i.e. sexual offenders seeking out violent porn).

Rothman stated in 2021: "In other words, five studies found that the sexual violence perpetrators had seen less pornography than other criminals." She added "Should these few “bad apples” spoil the pleasure of the potentially much larger subset of people who enjoy violent-looking pornography with no ill effects?"

Epidemiological studies
An epidemiological study describes the association between given behaviors or environmental conditions, and physical or psychological health by means of observation of real-world phenomena through statistical data. Epidemiological studies generally have high levels of external validity, insofar as they accurately describe events as they occur outside of a laboratory setting, but low levels of internal validity, since they do not strongly establish cause-and-effect relationships between the behaviors or conditions under study, and the health consequences observed.

Danish criminologist Berl Kutchinsky's Studies on Pornography and sex crimes in Denmark (1970), a scientific report ordered by the Presidential Commission on Obscenity and Pornography, found that the legalizing of pornography in Denmark had not resulted in an increase of sex crimes. In 1998 Milton Diamond from the University of Hawaii noted that in Japan, the number of reported cases of child sex abuse dropped markedly after the ban on sexually explicit materials was lifted in 1969; however, in Denmark and Sweden, there was a very slight increase in reported rapes after the liberalization of their pornography laws during the same time period, which scientists attribute to a higher awareness of what amounts to sex abuse.

Some researchers argue that there is a correlation between pornography and a decrease of sex crimes. The effects of Pornography: An International Perspective was an epidemiological study which found that the massive growth of the pornography industry in the United States between 1975 and 1995 was accompanied by a substantial decrease in the number of sexual assaults per capita - and reported similar results for Japan.

In 1986, a review of epidemiological studies by Neil M. Malamuth found that the quantity of pornographic material viewed by men was positively correlated with degree to which they endorsed sexual assault. Malamuth's work describes Check (1984), who found among a diverse sample of Canadian men that more exposure to pornography led to higher acceptance of rape myths, violence against women, and general sexual callousness. In another study, Briere, Corne, Runtz and Neil M. Malamuth, (1984) reported similar correlations in a sample involving college males. On the other hand, the failure to find a statistically significant correlation in another previous study led Malamuth to examine other interesting correlations, which took into account the information about sexuality the samples obtained in their childhood, and pornography emerged as the second most important source of information.  Malamuth's work has been criticized by other authors, however, such as Ferguson and Hartley (2009) who argue Malamuth has exaggerated positive findings and has not always properly discussed null findings. In a Quartz publication, Malamuth argued that porn is like alcohol: "whether it's bad for you depends on who you are" (stating that it increases violence in a few people, not in most people; it makes most people more relaxed).

Effects on relationships 
The consumption of pornography has a large reach across various areas of relationships in life. Pornography can influence an individual's relationship and intimacy through a number of channels, including overall level of satisfaction in their relationships, communication within a relationship, and setting boundaries for infidelity within a relationship.

Pornography's impact on relationship satisfaction comes under scrutiny, as findings range from negative correlations, to positive relationships. Pornography consumption is correlated with less relationship satisfaction, sexual satisfaction, and in men, less sexual desire for their partner. Researchers have concluded this could be because the novelty value of porn makes it difficult for a female partner to compete. Some research reports positive findings for women who consume pornography more regularly, including increased relationship satisfaction and decreased distress.

Relationship satisfaction 
The research on the relationship between pornography use and relationship satisfaction is vast and mixed. While some believe pornography consumption leads people to become less satisfied in their relationships, others believe it can have the direct opposite effect. Pornography consumption tends to accompany lower levels of satisfaction in long-term, heterosexual relationships. Most of the current research is correlational, indicating a connection but not a cause; however, one major trend is the rate of divorce. Couples who increase their consumption of pornography are nearly twice as likely to divorce than couples who do not, with the rate rising from 5% to 11%. Also, married adults who watch porn are twice as likely to be divorced after 6 years than married adults who don't watch porn. One mitigator is the frequency of pornography consumption. More frequent pornography consumption is negatively associated with relationship satisfaction. Individuals who report more frequent use of pornography within a relationship also report low levels of satisfaction in their relationships.

However, many reject the idea that pornography is inherently harmful to relationship satisfaction. Joint pornography consumption within a relationship has been connected to increased levels of relationship satisfaction for both partners. Couples who consumed pornography together expressed more satisfaction with their relationships than couples in which only one individual used pornography. This suggests that there is more at play than simply the consumption of pornography, such as the role of honesty and partner perception. Individuals whose partners are honest about their own pornography consumption tend to feel more satisfied in their relationships, to a point. There is evidence for an "honesty threshold," indicating that the relationship between honesty and pornography is not linear, and partners do not want to hear every detail about the other's pornography habits. This indicates that, although honesty and disclosure is important for pornography consumption, there seems to be a threshold of helpful honesty that, once surpassed, may cause more harm. In addition, when women consume pornography, they report lower levels of distress than their counterparts. While women often consume pornography less often than men, men are fairly accurate at perceiving their partner's pornography consumption. Women, on the other hand, are less accurate at perceiving their male partner's pornography use.

Some research suggests that there is no connection between relationship satisfaction and pornography use, whether individually or jointly. Although finding evidence in their second study for a negative correlation, a study of two independent male samples found no relationship between pornography and relationship satisfaction in their first sample. Conversely, other studies found no relationship whatsoever between joint pornography use and satisfaction. When analyzing couples and their pornography consumption over the course of one month, researchers found no correlation between relationship satisfaction and pornography use.

Wright and Herbenick (2022) suggest that White men (as research subjects) are almost entirely responsible for the statistical depreciation of relationship satisfaction due to pornography use. Women in general and men of other races do not have this problem.

Communication 
Communication is a vital component of any healthy relationship, and many researchers question how pornography may impact the ability of a couple to communicate openly. Honesty has been shown to be a mitigator in relationship effects of pornography consumption. Couples in which partners are honest about their pornography consumption report greater satisfaction than couples dealing with concealment, or dishonesty, surrounding pornography use. Pornography consumption among couples leads to improved communication about sexual desires, and increased openness in communication. Conversely, active concealment of pornography use habits can lead to less openness in communication and trust.

Another important aspect is the communication of affection within relationships. Affection Exchange Theory establishes the inherent role of affection within romantic relationships, and even in the role of survival, reproduction, and sexual selection. Trait attachment is positively associated with relationship satisfaction. Individuals who score higher in trait attachment report feeling and expressing greater sexual desire for their partners, compared to individuals who score lower in trait attachment. Some evidence indicates that the connection between Affection Exchange Theory and sexual desire is, in fact, stronger than the connection to relationship satisfaction, suggesting that sexual desire may have a crucial moderating role between the two. While this study found no correlation between pornography consumption and trait affection, researchers noted that increased feelings of guilt were related to lower levels of sexual desire for one's partner. This is somewhat indicative of partner-imposed or communicated guilt, or possibly reflecting an effect of the sexual scripts of pornography creating unrealistic expectations that lead to magnified dissatisfaction.

Occupational safety and health in the industry

Because the creation of pornography involves unsimulated sex, usually without condoms (barebacking), pornographic actors have been found to be particularly vulnerable to sexually transmitted diseases.

The AIDS Healthcare Foundation tried several times to have California's Department of Industrial Relations, Division of Occupational Safety and Health's Appeals Board force companies in the pornography industry to treat actors and actresses as employees subject to occupational safety and health regulation. In a 2014 case brought against Treasure Island Media, an administrative judge ruled that the company had to comply with the regulations.

Effect on adolescents
In the United Kingdom, the Association of Teachers and Lecturers feels schoolchildren need to be educated about pornography and warned what is reasonable and what is unacceptable. The UK children's commissioner initiated a meta-study conducted by researchers at Middlesex University which concluded that pornography is linked to unrealistic attitudes about sex, beliefs that women are sex objects, more frequent thoughts about sex, and found that children and young people who view pornography tend to hold less progressive gender role attitudes. Miranda Horvath stated about this: "But it is not possible to establish causation from correlational studies, and to say whether pornography is changing or reinforcing attitudes."

The Journal of Adolescence concluded in 2019 that the adolescent brain, due to its immature development, may be more sensitive to sexually explicit material, but due to a lack of empirical research, no firm conclusions can be drawn.

There are considerable ethical problems with performing some kinds of research on the effects of pornography use on minors.  For example, Rory Reid (UCLA) declared, "Universities don't want their name on the front page of a newspaper for an unethical study exposing minors to porn."

The PhD thesis of Marleen J.D. Katayama-Klaassen (2020), at the University of Amsterdam, found a low correlation, and could not show causality.

Peter and Valkenburg (2016) 20 years systematic review: its positive conclusions are tentative, and causality cannot be shown. Brown and Wisco (2019) systematic review: idem ditto.

See also
 Meese Report, 1986 U.S. Attorney General's Commission on Pornography
 Pornographication
 President's Commission on Obscenity and Pornography, 1969, United States
 Stanley v. Georgia, U.S. Supreme Court case that established a right to pornography
 Williams Committee, 1979 UK Committee on Obscenity and Film Censorship
 Religious views on pornography
 Sexual ethics
 Victorian morality

References

Further reading

External links
 Report of the Surgeon General's Workshop on Pornography and Public Health, United States Public Health Service, Office of the Surgeon General, August 4, 1986

 
Sexual misconduct
Interpersonal relationships

Behavioral addiction
Sexology
Sexuality